Khiladi may refer to:

 Khiladi (franchise), which includes:
 Khiladi (1992 film), an Indian action film
 Main Khiladi Tu Anari, 1994
 Sabse Bada Khiladi, 1995
 Khiladiyon Ka Khiladi, 1996
 Mr. and Mrs. Khiladi, 1997
 International Khiladi, 1999
 Khiladi 420, 2000
 Khiladi 786, 2012
 Khiladi (1968 film), a Hindi action film
 Kiladi, a 2000 Kannada film
 Khiladi (2013 film), a Bengali slapstick comedy film
 Khiladi (2016 film), a 2016 Bhojpuri-language film
 Khiladi (2022 film), a 2022 Indian Telugu-language action film starring Ravi Teja